Øystein Halvorsen is a Norwegian orienteering competitor who competed in the 1970s. He won bronze medals at the Norwegian Championships in 1973 and in 1976, and a silver medal in 1977.

He won a silver medal in the relay event at the 1976 World Orienteering Championships in Aviemore together with Jan Fjærestad, Svein Jacobsen and Egil Johansen, and placed tenth in the individual course.

References

Year of birth missing (living people)
Living people
Norwegian orienteers
Male orienteers
Foot orienteers
World Orienteering Championships medalists
20th-century Norwegian people